Zemětice is a municipality and village in Plzeň-South District in the Plzeň Region of the Czech Republic. It has about 300 inhabitants.

Administrative parts
Villages of Čelákovy and Chalupy are administrative parts of Zemětice.

References

Villages in Plzeň-South District